Jan Kudra (5 July 1937 – 31 January 2023) was a Polish cyclist. He competed in the individual road race at the 1964 Summer Olympics. He won the Tour de Pologne in 1962 and 1968.

Kudra died on 31 January 2023, at the age of 85.

References

External links
 

1937 births
2023 deaths
Polish male cyclists
Olympic cyclists of Poland
Cyclists at the 1964 Summer Olympics
Recipients of the Gold Cross of Merit (Poland)
Sportspeople from Łódź